Israeli General Staff or General Headquarters, abbreviated Matkal (מטכ"ל), is the supreme command of the Israel Defense Forces. It is based in the Kirya compound (Rabin Camp) in Tel Aviv.

Members

The majority of members in the General Staff Forum are officers ranked as Aluf and heads of the following military and civilian bodies:

Chief
 Chief of the General Staff – Rav Aluf Herzi Halevi
 Deputy Chief of the General Staff – Aluf Amir Baram

Arms
 Commander of GOC Army Headquarters – Aluf Tamir Yadai
 Commander of the Air Force – Aluf Tomer Bar
 Commander of the Navy – Aluf David Saar Salama

Directorates
Head of the Operations Directorate – Aluf Oded Basyuk
Head of the Intelligence Directorate – Aluf Aharon Haliva
Head of the Technological and Logistics Directorate – Aluf Mishel Yanko
Head of the Manpower Directorate – Aluf Yaniv Asor
Head of the Planning and Multi-Domain Force Design Directorate – Aluf Yaakov Banjo
Head of the Computer Service Directorate – Aluf Eran Niv
Head of the Strategy and Third-Circle Directorate – Aluf Tal Kalman

Commands
Aluf in-charge of the Northern Command – Aluf Ori Gordin
Aluf in-charge of the Central Command – Aluf Yehuda Fuchs 
Aluf in-charge of the Southern Command – Aluf Eliezer Toledano
Aluf in-charge of the Home Front Command – Aluf Rafi Milo

Other
Military Secretary to the Prime Minister – Aluf Avi Gil
 Commander of the Depth Corps and of the IDF Military Colleges unit – Aluf Itai Veruv
 Commander of the Northern Corps and Head of Maneuver Array – Aluf Saar Tzur
 Commander of the General Staff Corps and Head of Education and Training Command – Aluf Moti Barukh 
Coordinator of Government Activities in the Territories – Aluf Ghassan Elian
President of the Military Court of Appeals – Aluf Orli Markman
Military Advocate General – Aluf Yifat Tomer-Yerushalmi
 IDF Spokesperson – Tat-Aluf Ran Kochav
The Financial Advisor to the Chief of Staff – Tat-Aluf Gil Pinchas

Civilian
Director-general of the Ministry of Defense – Aluf (Res.) Amir Eshel
Defense Establishment Comptroller – Tat-Aluf (Res.) Yair Volansky
Head of Administration for the Development of Weapons and the Technological Industry – Tat-Aluf (Res.) Danny Gold

References
"The General Staff," official list

Staff (military)
Military units and formations of Israel